Seat Pleasant is an incorporated city in Prince George's County, Maryland, United States, located immediately east of Washington. Per the 2020 census, the population was 4,522. Two state highways pass through the community — Maryland routes 704 (now called Martin Luther King Jr. Highway and previously named George Palmer Highway in honor of banker and community leader George Palmer) and 214 (Central Avenue). The Washington Metro's Blue and Silver Lines are nearby. The Washington Commanders' stadium is east of Seat Pleasant, near the Capital Beltway (I-95/495).

History
Seat Pleasant is located on part of what had been the Williams-Berry estate.  In 1850, the descendants of General Otho Holland Williams, a Revolutionary War hero, and James Berry, a mid-17th-century Puritan leader, sold it to Joseph Gregory. Seat Pleasant was developed on the dairy farm of Joseph Gregory, the farm of the Hill family, and the land of building contractor Francis Carmody, among others. In 1873, some of the land along Addison Road was subdivided into small farms and rural home sites known as Jackson's Subdivision.

Designers of the Chesapeake Beach Railway, constructed in 1897–99 between Washington, D.C. and Chesapeake Beach, Maryland, located their first station in Maryland outside Washington on the railway's right-of-way that traversed the Gregory property. They called the station "District Line".  The Columbia Railway Company operated a streetcar system that extended through Northeast Washington and terminated in Seat Pleasant at Eastern Avenue, near what is today Martin Luther King Jr. Highway. Finally, the Washington, Baltimore and Annapolis Electric Railway passed through Seat Pleasant in 1908.  In 1906, the growing number of residents in the area around the station adopted a more imaginative name for their community — Seat Pleasant, after the early Williams-Berry estate. Prior to that, the area was known as Chesapeake Junction.

Steady growth of traffic on the railway between 1900 and its peak in 1920 translated into steady development for Seat Pleasant as a railroad suburb. Subdivisions were soon created, such as Seat Pleasant, Seat Pleasant Heights, Oakmont, Palmer's, Boyer's Addition, and Pleasant Hills. By 1915, two churches had been organized, and a fire department had been founded. The introduction of street lighting followed in 1918.  When the community was incorporated as a town in 1931, it had a school, water company, sewer connections courtesy of the District of Columbia's sanitary system, and reliable fire protection by the Seat Pleasant Fire and Community Welfare Association.  The Chesapeake Beach Railway ceased operations in 1935.  In the 1980s, the old railroad roundhouse and turntable were demolished to make room for the Addison Plaza Shopping Center on Central Avenue.

Post-World War II state highway construction spurred further development. Construction of "affordable" housing, notably the Gregory Estates apartments in 1949, was the catalyst for the migration of African-American families from the District of Columbia; before that time, the community had been all white. The right of way of the former Washington, Baltimore and Annapolis Electric Railway was utilized in the early 1940s for the George Palmer Highway, later renamed the Martin Luther King Jr. Highway.  The Addison Road Metro station opened for service on November 22, 1980.

Most of the testaments to the town's past are long gone. Two that remain are the Episcopal Addison Chapel (1809) and Mount Victory Baptist Church (1908).

Seat Pleasant's crime rate is higher than the national average. The violent crime rate, while still above average, has improved in recent years, dropping from 768.6 in 2003 to 272.2 in 2011.

Politics
The current mayor is Kelly Porter.

Schools
The city is served by the Prince George's County Public Schools district.

Zoned elementary schools include Seat Pleasant, Carmody Hills, and Highland Park elementary schools. All residents are zoned to G. James Gholson Middle School. High schools serving sections of the city are Fairmont Heights High School and Central High School.

Geography
Seat Pleasant is located at  (38.895362, -76.902205).

Demographics

2020 census

Note: the US Census treats Hispanic/Latino as an ethnic category. This table excludes Latinos from the racial categories and assigns them to a separate category. Hispanics/Latinos can be of any race.

2010 census
As of the census of 2010, there were 4,542 people, 1,650 households, and 1,135 families residing in the city. The racial makeup of the city was 2.0% White, 91.0% African American, 0.4% Native American, 0.4% Asian, 3.8% from other races, and 2.4% from two or more races. Hispanic or Latino of any race were 5.7% of the population.

There were 1,650 households, of which 37.7% had children under the age of 18 living with them, 26.2% were married couples living together, 35.3% had a female householder with no husband present, 7.3% had a male householder with no wife present, and 31.2% were non-families. 27.2% of all households were made up of individuals, and 10.5% had someone living alone who was 65 years of age or older. The average household size was 2.75 and the average family size was 3.32.

The median age in the city was 36.7 years. 25.9% of residents were under the age of 18; 9.7% were between the ages of 18 and 24; 24.6% were from 25 to 44; 25.7% were from 45 to 64; and 14.2% were 65 years of age or older. The gender makeup of the city was 45.1% male and 54.9% female.

2000 census
As of the census of 2000, there were 4,885 people, 1,697 households, and 1,243 families residing in the city. The racial makeup of the city was 2.01% White, 96.72% African American, 0.10% Native American, 0.16% Asian, 0.14% from other races, and 0.86% from two or more races. Hispanic or Latino of any race were 0.66% of the population.

There were 1,697 households, out of which 32.2% had children under the age of 18 living with them, 32.1% were married couples living together, 34.6% had a female householder with no husband present, and 26.7% were non-families. 22.2% of all households were made up of individuals, and 7.5% had someone living alone who was 65 years of age or older. The average household size was 2.86 and the average family size was 3.33.

In the city, the population was spread out, with 30.1% under the age of 18, 8.0% from 18 to 24, 27.3% from 25 to 44, 21.9% from 45 to 64, and 12.7% who were 65 years of age or older. The median age was 35 years. For every 100 females, there were 81.5 males. For every 100 females age 18 and over, there were 77.3 males.

The median income for a household in the city was $42,476, and the median income for a family was $45,332. Males had a median income of $30,704 versus $30,909 for females. The per capita income for the city was $17,802. About 15.8% of families and 19.6% of the population were below the poverty line, including 31.4% of those under age 18 and 11.1% of those age 65 or over.

Transportation

The main highway serving Seat Pleasant is Maryland Route 704. MD 704 connects southwest into Washington, D.C., and northeastward to U.S. Route 50 (John Hanson Highway).

The city is also served by the Addison Road and Capitol Heights Metro stations. Both stations are on the Blue Line and Silver Line.

Law enforcement
The Seat Pleasant Police Department (SPPD) is the primary law enforcement agency servicing the municipality.  The SPPD is assisted by the Prince George's County Police Department and the Sheriff's Office as directed by authority.

Prince George's County Police Department District 8 Station in Upper Marlboro CDP serves the community.

In 2021, Seat Pleasant retaliated against a whistleblower on the local police department who released videos of Seat Pleasant police engaging in wrongdoing or inappropriate behavior, which included assaulting an unarmed National Guardsman.

Fire protection
The Seat Pleasant Volunteer Fire Company Inc, also known as the Infamous 8 House, is the primary fire department serving the community. It is located at 6305 Addison Road, Seat Pleasant. It is home to both career and volunteer firefighters and EMTs. It houses two engines, Engine 82 and 83, and Ambulance 88. The total response area is about  serving over 250,000 citizens averaging about 7000 calls a year.

Bordering areas

 Carmody Hills (east)
 Peppermill Village (east)
 Summerfield (northeast)
 Landover (north)
 Fairmount Heights (northwest)
 Washington, D.C. (west)
 Capitol Heights (southwest)
 Walker Mill (south)

Notable people
 Michael Beasley, 2007 graduate of Notre Dame Preparatory High School; played for the Kansas State University basketball team
Jarrett Carter Sr, journalist and founder of the HBCU Digest
 Joe Clair, also known by the nickname "Joe Cleezy", stand-up comedian, radio DJ, and VJ, best known as the former host of BET's Rap City from 1994 to 1999; native of Seat Pleasant
 Kevin Durant, 2006 graduate of Montrose Christian School and attended the University of Texas at Austin; now playing for the NBA's Phoenix Suns

References

External links

 City of Seat Pleasant official website
 Maryland State Archives: Seat Pleasant

Cities in Maryland
Cities in Prince George's County, Maryland
1850 establishments in Maryland
Suburbs of Washington, D.C.